XEJUA-AM is a radio station on 640 AM in Ciudad Juárez, Chihuahua, Mexico. It is owned by Multimedios Radio and carries its La Lupe variety hits format.

By day, XEJUA is powered at 5,000 watts using a directional antenna.  Because AM 640 is an American clear-channel frequency reserved for 50,000 watt, Class A KFI Los Angeles, XEJUA is a daytimer.  It must leave the air between sunset and sunrise to avoid interfering with KFI.

History

XEJUA received its concession on June 22, 1992. It was owned by Multimedios executive Francisco Antonio González Sánchez.

For a time in the mid-2010s, XEJUA was operated by Chihuahua broadcaster Grupo BM Radio with an all-news radio format as BM Noticias and later BM Radio 640. Multimedios began operating the station again in 2017.

References

1992 establishments in Mexico
Radio stations established in 1992
Radio stations in Chihuahua
Daytime-only radio stations in Mexico
Spanish-language radio stations
Multimedios Radio